Mississippi Highway 468 (MS 468) runs from Mississippi Highway 475 in Flowood, Mississippi where it is known as Flowood Drive to MS 469 in Brandon, Mississippi. It is known as Pearson Road in Pearl, Mississippi.

Route description
MS 468 starts at MS 475 in Flowood and travels southwestwards along Flowood Drive. The route turns southward near Fourth Street in downtown Flowood. At U.S. Route 80 (US 80) in Pearl, MS 468 is briefly concurrent with the U.S. route, before traveling southwards at Pearson Road. The road crosses over Interstate 20 (I-20) at a diamond interchange and later turns southeastwards at Whitfield Road. It intersects the southern terminus of MS 475 near the Mississippi State Hospital and crosses over a railroad near Greenfield. MS 468 then intersects MS 469 and turns north at Bethel Road. At Greenfield Circle, the road turns northeastwards and meets MS 18 near Brandon. It turns east at Pine Lawn Drive, and the route turns north at South College Street. MS 468 ends at US 80 in downtown Brandon, and the road continues north as North College Street.

Major intersections

See also

References

External links

468
Transportation in Rankin County, Mississippi